The Siangic languages (or Koro-Holon languages) are a small family of possibly Sino-Tibetan languages spoken in Arunachal Pradesh, northeast India. The Siangic languages consist of Koro and Milang.

Classification
Milang, which has been extensively influenced by Padam (a Tani language), is alternatively classified as a divergent Tani language (Post & Blench 2011). Koro has undergone influence from Hruso (Post & Blench 2011). However, Milang and Koro do not belong to either the Tani or Hrusish groups of languages.

It is unclear whether the Siangic is a branch of Sino-Tibetan or an independent language family that has undergone extensive Sino-Tibetan influence. Post & Blench (2011) note that Siangic has a substratum of unknown origin, and consider Siangic to be an independent language family. Anderson (2014), who refers to Siangic as Koro-Holon instead, considers Siangic (Koro-Holon) to be a branch of Sino-Tibetan rather than an independent language family.

Greater Siangic

Roger Blench (2014) proposes a Greater Siangic family that includes the Digaro languages (Idu Mishmi and Taraon) and Pre-Tani, the hypothetical substrate language branch of Tani before it became relexified by Sino-Tibetan.

Proto-Greater Siangic
Pre-Tani
Idu-Taraon
Proto-Siangic
Koro
Milang

Reconstruction

Post & Blench (2011)
The following Proto-Siangic forms reconstructed by Mark Post & Roger Blench (2011:8-9) do not have lexical parallels with Proto-Tani, and are unique to the Siangic branch.

Modi (2013)
Modi (2013) lists the following Proto-Siangic forms, along with forms for Milang, Koro, Idu, Taraon, and Proto-Tani. Additional cognate sets that were not included in Post & Blench (2011) include black, house, salt, fat, and today.

See also
Greater Siangic comparative vocabulary list (Wiktionary)

References and notes

Bibliography
 Post, Mark W. and Roger Blench (2011). "Siangic: A new language phylum in North East India", 6th International Conference of the North East India Linguistics Society, Tezpur University, Assam, India, 31 Jan – 2 Feb.
 Blench, Roger (2014). Fallen leaves blow away: a neo-Hammarstromian approach to Sino-Tibetan classification. Presentation given at the University of New England, Armidale, 6 September 2014.

 
Greater Siangic languages
Languages of India
Proposed language families